Tiago José Pinto Machado (born 18 October 1985) is a Portuguese former professional road racing cyclist, who rode professionally between 2005 and 2022 for seven different teams. He took three victories during his career – the 2009 Portuguese National Time Trial Championships, a stage at the 2010 Circuit de la Sarthe, and the general classification at the 2014 Tour of Slovenia.

Career
Machado was born in Vila Nova de Famalicão.

NetApp–Endura (2014)
Following a successful start of the season, which saw him winning the overall classification of the Tour of Slovenia, his first Category 2.1 overall win, Machado started the Tour de France for the first time in his career. Machado had a strong start, and was third overall after nine stages. After being checked by the doctors and when he was expected to abandon the race, he ordered his team to give him back his bicycle, climbed 3 mountains and arrived to the finishing line last, 43 minutes behind the day's winner, Vincenzo Nibali. He was sutured after the stage, and despite arriving outside the time limit, the commissaires allowed Machado to continue on the race due to his efforts. French newspaper L'Équipe described Machado's effort as "heroic".

Team Katusha (2015–2018)
Machado left  after the 2014 campaign and joined  on an initial two-year contract. He signed a contract extension for the 2017 season in October 2016.

Return to Portuguese teams (2019–22)

At the 2022 Portuguese National Road Championships, Machado announced that he would retire from cycling at the end of the season.

Personal life
Machado is a supporter of S.L. Benfica.

Major results
Source: 

2006
 9th Overall GP CTT Correios de Portugal
2007
 1st  Young rider classification, Volta a Portugal
 2nd Overall Grand Prix du Portugal
 4th Overall Troféu Joaquim Agostinho
 6th Overall Volta ao Algarve
2008
 1st Overall Troféu Joaquim Agostinho
 National Road Championships
2nd Time trial
2nd Road race
 4th Overall Volta ao Alentejo
 5th Overall Vuelta a Extremadura
 9th Overall Volta a Portugal
1st  Young rider classification
2009
 1st  Time trial, National Road Championships
 2nd Overall Vuelta a Asturias
 2nd Overall Troféu Joaquim Agostinho
 4th Overall Volta ao Algarve
 4th Overall GP CTT Correios de Portugal
 5th Overall Vuelta a Extremadura
 5th Overall Volta a Portugal
1st  Young rider classification
 6th Overall Volta ao Alentejo
2010
 2nd Overall Circuit de la Sarthe
1st Stage 2b (ITT)
 3rd Overall Volta ao Algarve
1st  Portuguese rider classification
 3rd Overall Critérium International
1st  Young rider classification
 4th Overall Tour of Austria
 6th Overall Tour de Romandie
 7th Overall Vuelta a Castilla y León
 10th Overall Tour de Pologne
2011
 2nd Overall Giro del Trentino
 5th Overall Critérium International
 5th Overall Volta ao Algarve
 7th Overall Tirreno–Adriatico
2012
 3rd Overall Tour Down Under
 5th Overall Vuelta a Castilla y León
 5th Trofeo Deià
 6th Overall Volta ao Algarve
 8th Overall Tour de Pologne
 9th Overall Tour of California
2013
 1st  Mountains classification, Tour de Wallonie
 2nd Road race, National Road Championships
 4th Overall Driedaagse van West-Vlaanderen
 6th Overall Volta ao Algarve
 9th Overall Tour Down Under
 10th Overall Tour of Utah
2014
 1st  Overall Tour of Slovenia
 2nd Vuelta a Murcia
 3rd Road race, National Road Championships
 3rd Overall Critérium International
 4th Overall Tour of California
 6th Overall Giro del Trentino
 9th Clásica de Almería
 9th Coppa Bernocchi
2015
 National Road Championships
2nd Time trial
3rd Road race
 2nd Overall Bayern Rundfahrt
 3rd Overall Volta ao Algarve
1st  Portuguese rider classification
 4th Overall Circuit de la Sarthe
 7th Vuelta a Murcia
2016
 8th Overall Circuit de la Sarthe
  Combativity award Stages 5 & 11 Vuelta a España
2017
 10th Clássica Aldeias do Xisto
2018
 National Road Championships
3rd Time trial
4th Road race
2020
 3rd Time trial, National Road Championships

Grand Tour general classification results timeline

References

External links

1985 births
Living people
People from Vila Nova de Famalicão
Portuguese male cyclists
Sportspeople from Braga District